The Integral Coach Factory (ICF) coach was a conventional passenger coach used on the majority of main-line trains in India. The design of the coach was developed by Integral Coach Factory, Perambur, Chennai, India in collaboration with the Swiss Car & Elevator Manufacturing Co, Schlieren, Switzerland in the 1950s. The design is also called the Schlieren design based on the location of the Swiss company. The 1st ICF coach had been flagged by then Prime Minister Jawaharlal Nehru on 2 October 1955. The last ICF coach was flagged off by senior technician Shri Bhaskar P. in the presence of Railway Board Chairman Ashwani Lohani on 19 January 2018.

Technical

Bogie frame
The frame of the ICF coach is a fabricated structure made up of mild steel. Main sub-assemblies of bogie frame viz. side frames, transoms, headstocks, longitudinal forms the skeleton of the bogie frame. The sub assemblies are fabricated from flanges, webs, channels and Ribs by welding process.  Various types of brackets are welded to the frame for the purpose of primary and secondary suspension arrangement, alternator suspension arrangement and brake rigging arrangement. Various brackets viz. brake hanger brackets, brake lever hanger brackets, brake cylinder fixing brackets, anchor link brackets, bolster spring suspension brackets, alternator suspension brackets, belt tensioning bracket/s, axle box guides, suspension straps are welded on the bogie frames. It involves 40 meters (app.) of welding in a single conventional bogie frame. Based on load carrying capacity per axle, the conventional bogie frames are grouped into two types. They are 13 ton bogie frame and 16 ton bogie frame. 13 ton bogie frames are being used in the bogies of all non-AC mainline coaches and 16 ton bogie frames are being used in bogies of all AC coaches, power cars and diesel multiple unit trailer coaches.

Bogie bolster
A bogie bolster is the central section of the bogie that carries the entire weight of a coach's under frame.  The bogie pivots around it using the center pivot pin. It couples to the bogie frame at each end using the secondary suspension system (typically coil springs and spring plank).

Center pivot pin
A center pivot pin is bolted to the body bolster. The center pivot pin runs down vertically through the center of the bogie bolster through the center pivot. It allows for rotation of the bogie when the coach is moving on the curves. A silent block, which is cylindrical metal rubber bonded structure, is placed in the central hole of the bogie bolster through which the center pivot pin passes. It provides the cushioning effect.

Wheel set assembly
Wheel arrangement is of Bo-Bo type as per the UIC classification. The wheel set assembly consists of two pairs of wheels and axle. The wheels may be cast wheels or forged wheels. The wheels are manufactured at Rail Wheel Factory, Chapra, Bihar or at Rail Wheel Factory of Indian Railways bases at Yelahanka near Bangalore in the state of Karnataka. At times, imported wheels are also used. These wheels and axles are machined in the various railway workshops in the wheels shops and pressed together.

Roller bearing assembly
Roller bearings are used on the ICF coaches. These bearings are press fitted on the axle journal by heating the bearings at a temperature of 80 to 100 °C in an induction furnace. Before fitting the roller bearing, an axle collar is press fitted. The collar ensures that the bearing does not move towards the center of the axle. After pressing the collar, a rear cover for the axle box is fitted. The rear cover has two main grooves. In one of the grooves, a nitrile rubber sealing ring is placed. The sealing ring ensures that the grease in the axle box housing does not seep out during the running of the wheels. A woolen felt ring is placed in another groove. After the rear cover, a retaining ring is placed. The retaining ring is made of steel and is a press fit. The retaining ring ensures that the rear cover assembly is secured tightly between the axle collar and the retaining ring and stays at one place. The roller bearing is pressed after the retraining ring. Earlier, the collar and the bearings were heated in an oil bath. But now the practices has been discontinued and an induction furnace is used to heat them before fitting on the axle. The axle box housing, which is a steel casting, is then placed on the axle. The bearing is housed in the axle box housing. Axle box grease is filled in the axle box housing. Each axle box housing is filled with approximately 2.5 kg. of grease. The front cover for the axle box is placed on a housing which closes the axle box. The front cover is bolted by using torque wrench.

Brake beam assembly
ICF coaches use two types of brake beams. 13 ton and 16 ton. Both of the brake beams are fabricated structures. The brake beam is made from steel pipes and welded at the ends. The brake beam has a typical isosceles triangle shape. The two ends of the brake beam have a provision for fixing a brake head. The brake head in turn receives the brake block. The material of the brake block is non-asbestos and non-metallic in nature.it is a safety item.

Brake head
Two types of brake heads are used.  ICF brake head and the IGP brake head. A brake head is a fabricated structure made up of steel plates welded together.

Brake blocks
Brake blocks are also of two types. ICF brake head uses the "L" type brake block and the "K" type brake block is used on the IGP type brake head. "L" & "K" types are so called since the shape of the brake blocks resembles the corresponding English alphabet letter. The third end of the brake beam has a bracket for connecting the "Z" & the floating lever. These levers are connected to the main frame of the bogie with the help of steel brackets. These brackets are welded to the bogie frame. L Type are low friction Composite Brake Block and K Type are high friction Composite Brake Block.

Brake levers
Various type of levers are used on the ICF coaches . The typical levers being the "Z" lever, floating lever and the connecting lever. These levers are used to connect the brake beam with the piston of the brake cylinder. The location of the brake cylinders decides whether the coach shall be a BMBC coach or a non BMBC coach. Conventional coaches are those ICF coaches in which the brake cylinder is mounted on the body of the coach and not placed on the bogie frame itself.

Brake cylinder
In an ICF BMBC coach, the brake cylinder is mounted on the bogie frame itself. Traditionally, the ICF coaches were conventional type i.e. the brake cylinder was mounted on the body of the coach. However, in the later modification, the new bogies are being manufactured with the BMBC designs only. Even the old type bogies are being converted into BMBC coaches. The BMBC coach has many advantages over the conventional ICF coach. The foremost being that, since the brake cylinder is mounted on the bogie frame itself and is nearer to the brake beam, the brake application time is reduced. Moreover, a small brake cylinder is adequate for braking purpose. This also reduces the overall weight of the ICF coach apart from the advantage of quick brake application.

Primary suspension
The primary suspension in an ICF coaches is through a dashpot arrangement. The dashpot arrangement consists of a cylinder (lower spring seat) and the piston (axle box guide). Axle box springs are placed on the lower spring seat placed on the axle box wing of the axle box housing assembly. A rubber or a Hytrel washer is placed below the lower spring seat for cushioning effect. The axle box guide is welded to the bogie frame. The axle box guide acts as a piston. A homopolymer acetyle washer is placed on the lower end of the axle box guide. The end portion of the axle box guide is covered with a guide cap, which has holes in it. A sealing ring is placed near the washer and performs the function of a piston ring. The axle box guide moves in the lower spring seat filled with dashpot oil. This arrangement provides the dampening effect during the running of the coach.

Dashpot arrangement
The dashpot arrangement is mainly a cylinder piston arrangement used on the primary suspension of Indian Railway coaches of ICF design. The lower spring seat acts as a cylinder and the axle box guide acts as a piston.

The axle box guide (piston) is welded to the bottom flange of the bogie side frame. Similarly, the lower Spring seat (cylinder) is placed on the axle box housing wings forms a complete dashpot guide arrangement of the ICF design coaches.

Axle box guides traditionally had a guide cap with 9 holes of 5mm diameter each; however, in the latest design, the guide cap is made an integral part of the guide. Approximately 1.5 liters of dashpot oil is required per guide arrangement.

Air vent screws are fitted on the dashpot for topping of oil so that the minimum oil level is maintained at 40mm.

Traditionally, rubber washers have been used at the seating arrangement of the primary springs of the axle box housing in the ICF design passenger coaches on the Indian Railways. The rubber washer is used directly on the axle box seating area. the lower spring seat sits on the washers. The lower spring seat is a tubular structure and 3/4 section is partitioned by using a circular ring which is welded at the 3/4 section. On the top of spring seat, a polymer ring called NFTC ring sits. The primary spring sits on the NFTC ring. The lower spring seat plays the role of a cylinder in the dashpot arrangement and is filled with oil. In the dashpot arrangement, the top portion is called the axle box guide. The axle box guide is welded to the bogie frame. The axle box guide works as a piston in the Lower spring seat filled with oil. This helps in damping the vibrations caused during running train operation.

Export
Thirty ICF coaches were exported to the Philippines in the 1970s. They were built either as 7E Third/Economy Class cars with forced ventilation, or as Sleeper Economy cars with triple berths for trains on the South Main Line between Manila and Legazpi, Albay. These were nicknamed the Madras coaches after the old name of the city of Chennai where the ICF is located. All ICF coaches in the Philippines were scrapped by 2009.

Image gallery

References

Railway coaches of India